Jann Mar Padasas Yosures (born June 30, 1996), known professionally as JM Yosures, is a Filipino singer and recording artist. He rose to fame after winning the fourth season of It's Showtime's Tawag ng Tanghalan in 2021. His rendition of the Maalaala Mo Kaya theme song, was the third and final version to be used by the show before its conclusion.

Biography 
JM Yosures was born on June 30, 1996, in Quezon City, Philippines. He is the only child of his biological father—whom he has not met—and his mother, Mylin Padasas, whom was married to Judy Yosures. His biological father left him when he was still an infant. He completed his elementary education in San Juan Elementary School in Quezon City, then subsequently he and his family moved to Taguig City, which eventually he transferred to Kapt. Jose Cardones Memorial Elementary School. He finished his secondary education in Taguig Science High School, and his tertiary education in University of the Philippines Diliman with a Bachelor of Science in Industrial Engineering, which he was a scholar of DOST (Department of Science and Technology).

He has noted as Sarah Geronimo, SB19, Gary Valenciano, Sam Smith, Bruno Mars, and Adele as his favorite musical artists.

Career 
Prior to his later triumph, he tried to audition at The Voice, The Clash, Pinoy Big Brother, and Idol Philippines, but was not accepted.

Tawag ng Tanghalan 
On February 6, 2021, after the three-week-long Resbakbakan rounds, Yosures was one of the nine finalists to compete for the title of being the Grand Champion of the show's fourth season. He performed a medley of Lady Gaga's songs, namely "Million Reasons", "I'll Never Love Again", and "You and I", which garnered the highest amalgamated score of 89.5% from the judges and public's votes. He was awarded with a prize money of ₱1 million, a recording contract with Star Music, a management contract with Star Magic, a brand new house and lot from Lessandra worth ₱2 million, and a trophy.

Discography

Filmography

Awards and nominations

References 



21st-century Filipino singers
1996 births
Living people
People from Quezon City
ABS-CBN personalities
Star Magic
University of the Philippines Diliman alumni